General Mohamed Hasan Abdullahi also known as "Jidhif" was a chief of staff of the Somaliland Armed Forces. He hails from the Jibril Abokor, a Sa'ad Musa sub-division of the Habr Awal Isaaq clan that predominantly inhabits the Gabiley region, and was born in Gabiley, Somaliland. In the 1980s, he joined the Somali National Movement. Before being appointed as the chief of staff, he was head of Mercy Corps in Somaliland.

Chief of staff
He was appointed as the chief of staff of the Military of Somaliland in a presidential decree by President Mohamed Haji Ibrahim Egal. He succeeded the rehabilitation of the Somaliland clans that was spearheaded at that time by General Hassan Yonis Habane.

On 11 December 2011, he was reappointed as chief of staff of the military of Somaliland in a presidential decree by President Ahmed Mahamoud Silanyo. On 9 February 2012, Abdullahi was sacked due to the inability of Somaliland Armed Forces' to take control of Buuhoodle from forces loyal to the then newly established Khatumo State. He was later succeeded by General Nuh Ismail Tani as the Somaliland chief of staff.

References

Year of birth missing (living people)
Somalian military leaders
Living people
Somalian generals